Granvia l'Hospitalet or Granvia l'H is a district ("Districte VII") in the municipality of L'Hospitalet de Llobregat, a south-western suburb of the Barcelona metropolitan area.

Part of Granvia L'H is part of Gran Via business center of Barcelona and directly Fira de Barcelona, second largest trade fair and exhibition centres in Europe.

Public transport 
The Granvia area is served by line 8 of the Barcelona Metro and FGC commuter train network, at the Europa-Fira station, and also by the bus line 79.

References 

L'Hospitalet de Llobregat
Business districts